The Bora-class, Soviet designation Project 1239, hoverborne guided-missile corvette of the Russian Navy, also bears the NATO class name "Dergach",  is one of the few types of military surface effect ship built solely for marine combat purposes, rather than troop landing or transport. The first vessel produced under this designation was Sivuch, which was later renamed Bora. It is one of the largest combat sea vehicles with catamaran design.

The weapons array Bora-class warships carry varies depending on which of several configurations it is built to. The specifications listed are for the two existing craft.

Deployment 
The Bora class was designed in 1988 mainly for coastal defense and patrol duties against surface vessels, large and small. Two were built and are currently in service, both assigned to the Russian Black Sea Fleet. A future series of hovercraft have been planned based on this model for future production.

Ships

See also
List of ships of the Soviet Navy
List of ships of Russia by project number

References

External links
 Missile hovercraft, project 1239. @ Zelenodolsk Plant 
 Rosoboronexport State Export Corporation Website, Navy Catalog - Various export configurations are listed in this catalog. Follow the link and click the "PROJECT 1239 BORA" link on the third page of the pdf.
 Guided Missile Corvette "Bora" from Russian Black Sea fleet (with Hi-Res photos)
 Guided Missile Corvette "Samum" from Russian Black Sea fleet (with 30 photos)
 Guided Missile Corvette 1239 Bora class
 Project 1239 Sivuch @ FAS.org
 Google Maps photo
 All Russian Bora Class Ships - Complete Ship List

Corvette classes
Corvettes of the Russian Navy
Corvettes of the Soviet Navy
Military catamarans
Ship classes of the Russian Navy